Clastoptera arborina, the red cedar spittlebug, is a species of spittlebug in the family Clastopteridae. It is found in North America.

References

Clastopteridae
Articles created by Qbugbot
Insects described in 1927